Dasyuromorphia (meaning "hairy tail" in Greek) is an order comprising most of the Australian carnivorous marsupials, including quolls, dunnarts, the numbat, the Tasmanian devil, and the thylacine. In Australia, the  exceptions include the omnivorous bandicoots (order Peramelemorphia) and the marsupial moles (which eat meat but are very different and are now accorded an order of their own, Notoryctemorphia). Numerous South American species of marsupials (orders Didelphimorphia, Paucituberculata, and Microbiotheria) are also carnivorous, as were some extinct members of the order Diprotodontia, including extinct kangaroos (such as Ekaltadeta and Propleopus) and thylacoleonids, and some members of the partially extinct clade Metatheria and all members of the extinct superorder Sparassodonta.

The order contains four families: one with just a single living species (the numbat), two with only extinct species (including the thylacine and Malleodectes), and one, the Dasyuridae, with 73 extant species.

Characteristics
Unlike herbivores, which tend to become highly specialized for particular ecological niches and diversify greatly in form, carnivores tend to be broadly similar to one another, certainly on the level of gross external form. Just as Northern Hemisphere carnivores like cats, mongooses, foxes and weasels are much more alike in structure than, for example, camels, goats, pigs and giraffes, so too are the marsupial predators constrained to retain general-purpose, look-alike forms—forms which mirror those of placental carnivores. The names given to them by early European settlers reflect this: the thylacine was called the Tasmanian tiger or Tasmanian wolves, quolls were called native cats or native foxes, and so on.

The primary specialisation among marsupial predators is that of size: prior to the massive environmental changes that came about with the arrival of humans about 50,000 years ago, there were several very large carnivores, none of them members of the Dasyuromorphia and all of them now extinct. Those that survived into historical times ranged from the wolf-sized thylacine to the tiny long-tailed planigale which at 4 to 6 grams is less than half the size of a mouse. Most, however, tend towards the lower end of the size scale, typically between about 15 or 20 grams and about 2 kilograms, or from the size of a domestic mouse to that of a small domestic cat.

Classification

To provide context, the table below also shows the other major branches of the Australasian marsupial tree.

 Order Microbiotheria: (1 species, the monito del monte of South America)
 Order Dasyuromorphia
 Family †Thylacinidae
 †Thylacine (Thylacinus cynocephalus)
 Family Dasyuridae (72 species in 20 genera)
 Subfamily Dasyurinae: quolls, kowari, mulgara, little red kaluta, dibblers, phascogales, antechinuses, pseudantechinuses, and the Tasmanian devil
 Subfamily Sminthopsinae: dunnarts, kultarr, planigales and ningaui
 Family Myrmecobiidae
 Numbat (Myrmecobius fasciatus)
Family †Malleodectidae
Genus †Malleodectes
 Order Peramelemorphia (21 species: rainforest bandicoots, bandicoots, and bilbies)
 Order Notoryctemorphia (two species of marsupial moles)
 Order Diprotodontia (about 137 species in 11 families, including the koala, wombats, possums, potoroos, kangaroos, wallabies and others)

References

External links
Dasyuromorphia on Animal Diversity Web

 
Mammal orders
Extant Chattian first appearances
Taxa named by Theodore Gill